Gangavaram is a village in Rowthulapudi Mandal, Kakinada district in the state of Andhra Pradesh in India.

Geography 

Demographics 
 India census, Gangavaram Village had a population of 1,253, out of which 624 were male and 629 were female. Population of children below 6 years of age were 139. The literacy rate of the village is 43.54%.

References 

Villages in Rowthulapudi mandal